The Public Service Commission of West Virginia  is the Public Utilities Commission of the State of West Virginia, U.S.A.

Operation 
Chairman Charlotte Lane, Renee Larrick, and Bill Raney are the three commissioners. These positions are political appointments with six-year terms. Commissioners are appointed by the Governor and confirmed by the Senate.
 
The Commission supervises, regulates, and, where appropriate, investigates the rates, service, operations, affiliated transactions, and other activities of West Virginia public utilities and many common and contract motor carriers of passengers and property within West Virginia. Some of the industries the Commission regulates include:
 Electric Utilities
 Natural Gas Utilities
 Telephone Utilities (land line services)
 Private and Publicly Owned Water and Sewer Utilities 
 Public Storm Water Service Districts
 Gas Pipeline Safety 
 Solid Waste Carriers (intrastate)
 Commercial Solid Waste facilities (landfills)
 Taxi Cabs 
 Towing Services that are arranged by someone other than the owner
 Safety, weight, and speed-limit enforcement of all commercial motor vehicles 
 Transportation of hazardous materials including identification, registration, and permitting of commercial motor vehicles transporting such materials 
 Coal Resource Transportation System (CRTS)
 Railroad Safety 
 Regulation of Fees and Charges for Setting and Care of Veterans Grave Markers

The Public Service Commission of West Virginia does not regulate:
 Internet Service Providers 
 Private telephone equipment 
 Butane, Propane, and Gasoline 
 Oil and Gas Wells 
 Cable Television Rates 
 Long-Distance Telephone Rates 
 Wireless cell phone service

Location 
The Commission is located at 201 Brooks Street in Charleston. Its regular hours of operation are 9:00 a.m. to 5:00 p.m., Monday through Friday, except on state and federal holidays.

See also 
Virginia Mae Brown
 Brooks McCabe

External links
Official Website

State agencies of West Virginia
West Virginia